Robert S. Harrison is an American banker, lawyer, and educational & philanthropic administrator.

Currently he serves as the Chairman of the Cornell University Board of Trustees.

He received a bachelor's degree from Cornell University in 1976, and subsequently was a Rhodes Scholar at University of Oxford and received a juris doctor from Yale University. At Cornell, Harrison was a student-elected member of the university Board of Trustees, active in student government, a disc jockey at WVBR-FM, brother of Sigma Phi, and member of the Quill and Dagger society.

Previously, he worked for Davis Polk & Wardwell and Goldman Sachs and did fundraising for the presidential campaigns of Wesley Clark and John Kerry. Harrison served as CEO of the Clinton Global Initiative from 2007 to 2016.

References

Living people
American Rhodes Scholars
Goldman Sachs people
Cornell University alumni
Yale Law School alumni
American lawyers
Davis Polk & Wardwell lawyers
American chief executives
Year of birth missing (living people)